Dennis Cole (July 19, 1940 – November 15, 2009) was an American actor in film and television. A familiar face on the screen during the 1960s and 1970s, Cole made guest appearances in numerous television series. After the 1991 murder of his son, Joe Cole, he became an activist who spoke against violence on television.

Career
Cole began performing in his native Detroit and moved to Los Angeles in the 1960s. His blond, athletic look of a quintessential California surfer earned him the attention of physique magazines. He worked as a model and stuntman before making the transition to acting. His first big acting break came when he landed a starring role in the police drama Felony Squad, which ran from 1966 to 1969. He appeared for one season (1969–1970) as Davey Evans in Bracken's World. He co-starred with Rod Taylor in the TV series Bearcats! (1971) and played Lance Prentiss on the TV soap series The Young and the Restless (1981–82).

Cole made guest appearances in numerous television series, such as Medical Center, Police Story, Charlie's Angels, Vega$, The Feather and Father Gang, The Eddie Capra Mysteries, The Love Boat, Fantasy Island, Three's Company,  Divorce Court, and Murder, She Wrote. Cole's film career included roles in Cave-In! (1983), Wheels of Fire (1985), Pretty Smart (1987), and the horror film Zombie Death House (1987), directed by John Saxon. Cole's last television appearance was a 1998 episode of Pacific Blue.

Personal life
In 1976, when Cole guest-starred on the set of Charlie's Angels, he met his second wife, actress Jaclyn Smith. After a 19-month courtship the couple wed. Their marriage lasted from 1978 to 1981.

Joe Cole, his only son from his first marriage with Sally Bergeron, was shot dead in 1991, at the age of 30, during a home invasion robbery attempt in the Venice section of Los Angeles. That crime remains unsolved.

After the death of his son, Cole became an activist speaking against violence on television. He worked with the Nicole Brown Charitable Foundation to raise awareness for victims of crime, and with the Cancer Society, the Arthritis and Cystic Fibrosis foundations and other charitable organizations.

Dennis was a regular celebrity attendee at the annual Madden Derby Eve party hosted by Anita Madden in Lexington, KY.  Dennis was Anita Madden's escort for this event for several years.

Cole performed as the Narrator in a production of Blood Brothers and as King Marchan in the first national tour of the musical Victor/Victoria. While working on a national tour of Victor/Victoria, Cole was injured and spent three years recovering.
 
Cole relocated to Fort Lauderdale, FL in 1999 where he became a real-estate broker and opened his own real estate company with his third wife Marjorie Cole whom he married in 2004. The couple owned and operated Celebrity Realty, Inc. The couple divorced in 2008 after claims of domestic violence that eventually resulted in his arrest for obstruction of justice.

Death
Cole died at Holy Cross Hospital in Fort Lauderdale, Florida on November 15, 2009, aged 69, from kidney failure and was buried at the Forest Lawn, Hollywood Hills Cemetery in Los Angeles.

References

External links

 
 
 

1940 births
2009 deaths
American male film actors
American male musical theatre actors
American male soap opera actors
American male television actors
Deaths from kidney failure
Male actors from Detroit
Burials at Forest Lawn Memorial Park (Hollywood Hills)
20th-century American male actors
20th-century American singers
20th-century American male singers